Eight Days, Assassination Attempts against King Jeongjo is a South Korean television miniseries starring Kim Sang-joong, Park Jung-chul, Jung Ae-ri, Lee Seon-ho, and Hee Won. The series ran for 10 episodes, and was aired by CGV from November 17, 2007 to December 16, 2007. This show is placed in the context of the eight days procession organized in 1795 by King Jeongjo of Joseon to visit the tomb of his father at Hwaseong Fortress. This historic event was a huge one, involving 5,661 people and 1,417 horses.

Synopsis
The screenplay is based on the novel Journey (lit. "a round trip") written in 2006 by Oh Se-yeong. The background of the action is the 1795 procession organized by King Jeongjo of Joseon for the 60th birthday of his mother, Lady Hyegyeong that also commemorated the 60th birthday of his deceased father, the Crown Prince Sado. During the eight days period when the Court left the palace for the ceremony, the show introduces several assassination attempts against the King. A first one comes from the Moon In-bang's group (a millenarist sect). But this plot is used by the Noron Faction to pursue its own agenda, attempting an armed suppression against the Sipa Faction and the King as well.

Apart from the fictional elements, a major focus is placed on two historical sources. The Memoirs of Lady Hyegyeong is extensively used during many flashback sequences relative to events that occurred before the death (1762) of Crown Prince Sado, while the official documents from the Joseon Royal Library are used for the current events: the "Wonhaeng Eulmyo Jeongni Uigwe" (Eulmyo=1795) for the procession itself, and the "Hwaseong Seongyeokuigwe" concerning the Hwaseong Fortress as a whole.

This series is often referred as Eight Days, Mystery of Jeong Jo Assassination, a misleading translation since King Jeongjo won the 1795 confrontation and only died in 1800.

Documents about the real-life 1795 procession

The main document of the 1795 procession is an eight-panel screen, the Hwaseonghaenghaengdo Byeongpun. Nowadays, three copies of this screen exists: a sepia one, a blue one and a colored one, the King's copy. This last copy can be seen at Samsung Museum of Art Leeum and has been designated as Korean National Treasure 1430 in 2005-04-15.

Map of the Hwaseong Fortress in the 1800 Uigwe.

Cast and characters
As described in the credits of the last episode, the drama involves the following characters:

 When provided, birth and death years are given according to the real life of the character.

Artistic license
 The Memoirs of Lady Hyegyeong are in fact a collection of four different documents, written at different times, for different audiences. The description of the controversial behavior of Crown Prince Sado occurs in the 1805 Memoir, ten years after the procession, and not in the 1795 Memoir.
 Mun Inbang 문인방 is described as linked to a peasant uprising in 1786 (byeongo 병오). In Jeongjo Sillok, the first mention of Mun Inbang is 1782-04-04  and his trial is 1782-11-20  under various charges, propagating Jeonggamnok among them. Thereafter, Mun Inbang's name is only used to imply guilt by association, not to describe a prison escapee.
 Hong Bonghan is described in the series as a Noron leader during both reigns of Yeongjo and Jeongjo, but he rather appears as a key Sipa in the Haboush's translation of the Memoirs.
 In the real Court, the red robe was for the highest ranks, the blue for the intermediate ranks, and green for the lowest ranks. In the series, the blue dress is the uniform of the villains, while the red dress is the uniform of the "good ones". This helps the viewer to identify who's who, but this can also be a POV-시파 joke from the screenwriter.

References

Bibliography

  

, 727 pages.

, 329 pages.

 1782-04-04 Sillok 

 1782-11-20 Sillok 

Official Web Site of the Hwaseong Fortress
UNESCO Hwaseong Fortress Site

External links

Eight Days, Assassination Attempts against King Jeongjo at Daum 

Television series set in the Joseon dynasty
2007 South Korean television series debuts
2007 South Korean television series endings
Korean-language television shows
Channel CGV television dramas
Television shows based on South Korean novels
South Korean historical television series